Mariano Perez Flormata Jr. (born July 26, 1985), more popularly known by his screen name Neil Perez, is a Filipino actor, model, police officer, and male beauty pageant titleholder who was crowned Mister International 2014 in Ansan, Seoul, South Korea. He is the first Filipino to win the Mister International title in the history of the competition.

Personal life
Perez attended the Manuel L. Quezon University in Manila, the Philippines and graduated with a degree in criminology.

Pageantry

Misters of the Filipinas 2014
Perez won the title of Mister International Philippines 2014 at the Misters of Filipinas 2014 pageant on September 7, 2014. He bested 25 other candidates. During the competition, he was conferred six (6) special awards: Mister Photogenic, Best in Swimwear, Mister Unisilver, Mister Informatics, Mister Multidestination, and Crossfit Challenge Winner by Crossfit Halcyon'.  Perez represented the Philippines in the Mister International 2014 competition held at Hotel Inter-Burgo Ballroom, Ansan, Seoul, South Korea on February 14, 2015 and won the title.

Mister International 2014
Perez was crowned Mister International 2014 at Hotel Inter-Burgo Ballroom, Ansan, Seoul, South Korea on February 14, 2015. He also won 2nd runner-up in the national costume competition. He offered his victory in honor of the 44 Special Action Force crew who were killed in the Mamasapano clash on January 25, 2015.

During his reign, Perez traveled to the Czech Republic, Thailand, Myanmar, Cambodia, Laos, France, Macedonia, Gibraltar, Uzbekistan, Russia, the Netherlands, and South Korea, besides traveling across his native Philippines.

Filmography

TV appearances
On September 27, 2014, Perez portrayed himself on GMA 7's drama anthology Magpakailanman entitled “Poging Policeman: the Mariano Flormata Jr. Story” (actor Kristofer Martin portrayed Perez as a young adult). In 2015, he played teacher for TV5's Wattpad mini drama, opposite Isabella de Leon.
He was also included in the Third Batch of Lucky Stars for the Kapamilya, Deal or No Deal; he was keeper of briefcase number 18. He got a chance to play on April 15, 2015 in the same show, where he took the banker's offer of PhP105,000. He appeared on Eat Bulaga's #AldubMostAwaitedDate episode,  and on the September 20, 2015 episode of Sunday PINASaya's Kantaserye presents "Sari-Sari Luv" as Col. Tim, to promote the series Princess in the Palace which premiered on September 21, 2015.

Other
Flormata was also featured in the May 2015 issue of Men's Health Asia magazine, covered by Filipino actor James Reid.

See also
Mister International
Misters of Filipinas
Philippines at major beauty pageants

References

External links
 Official Mister International website
 Official Misters of the Philippines website

1985 births
Living people
Mister International
Male beauty pageant winners
Filipino police officers
Filipino male models
People from Tondo, Manila
Manuel L. Quezon University alumni
Male actors from Metro Manila
Male actors from Manila
21st-century Filipino male actors
Filipino male television actors
Filipino male film actors
Filipino beauty pageant winners